Steven or Steve Roberts may refer to:

 Steven V. Roberts (born 1943), American journalist and writer
 Steven Roberts (British Army soldier) (died 2003), first British soldier to die in the 2003 invasion of Iraq
 Steve Roberts (American football) (born 1964), college football coach at Arkansas State University
 Steve Roberts (comics), British comics artist
 Steve Roberts (drummer) (died 2022), British drummer (UK Subs)
 Steven Roberts (Missouri politician), Missouri State Senator

See also
 Stephen Roberts (disambiguation)